Christmas Means Love is a 2005 Christmas album by American singer-songwriter Joan Osborne.

Reception
The editorial staff of AllMusic Guide scored this album three out of five stars, with reviewer Thom Jurek noting that the release is not essential, but Christmas albums largely are not and "Osborne's voice being what it is, she could sing the back of a cereal box and make it interesting".

Track listing
"Christmas Means Love" (Morris Dollison, Jr.) – 3:06
"Santa Claus Baby" (John Dolphin and William York) – 2:34
"Away in a Manger" (traditional) – 4:35
"Christmas Must Be Tonight" (Robbie Robertson) – 3:59
"Cherry Tree Carol" (traditional) – 3:39
"Christmas in New Orleans" (Dick Sherman and Joseph Van Winkle) – 3:35
"Children Go Where I Send Thee" (traditional) – 4:23
"Angels We Have Heard On High" (traditional) – 3:20
"What Do Bad Girls Get?" (Joan Osborne) – 2:32
"Great Day in December" (Claude Jeter) – 4:45
"Silent Night" (traditional) – 3:08

Personnel
Joan Osborne – vocals, arrangement
Ennis Glendon – musical assistance
Tor Hyams – production
John Leventhal – guitar, piano on "Silent Night"
Vincenzo LoRusso – recording, mixing
Mike Mierau – mastering
Chris Muse – engineering
Geoff Pearlman – slide guitar on "Cherry Tree Carol"
Red Herring Design – design
Catherine Russell – backing vocals
Gary Schreiner – piano, organ, harmonica, tubular bells, strings, arrangement
Billy Ward – drums
Tracy Wormworth – bass guitar

See also
List of 2005 albums

References

External links

2005 Christmas albums
Albums produced by Tor Hyams
Christmas albums by American artists
Joan Osborne albums